WRNS may refer to:

 Women's Royal Naval Service, the former women's branch of the British Royal Navy
 WRNS (AM), a radio station (960 AM) licensed to serve Kinston, North Carolina, United States
 WRNS-FM, a radio station (95.1 FM) licensed to serve Kinston, North Carolina